Thaddeus Rutter Shideler (October 17, 1883 – June 22, 1966) was an American hurdler who competed in the early twentieth century. He competed in athletics at the 1904 Summer Olympics and won a silver medal in the 110 meters hurdles. Fred Schule won the gold medal.

Competing for Indiana University, Shideler held an unofficial world record set a month before the 1904 Summer Olympics with a time of 15.0 seconds in the 100 meters hurdle. The watch of one of the three timers failed to start costing Shideler official verification for the mark.

References

External links
Profile

1883 births
1966 deaths
American male hurdlers
Olympic silver medalists for the United States in track and field
Athletes (track and field) at the 1904 Summer Olympics
Place of birth missing
Medalists at the 1904 Summer Olympics